Joseph D. Sami and Jerald Arockiam, collectively known as J. D.–Jerry, are an Indian filmmaking duo in Tamil cinema.

Career
Their pair's first film as directors was Ullaasam (1997) which had Ajith Kumar and Vikram in the lead roles and produced by Amitabh Bachchan. Despite having a high-profile cast and production studio, the film became a failure at the box office. They have also directed Whistle (2003) and numerous Tamil television serials. The duo have made an animation feature film Pandavas in 2005. The duo subsequently next worked as Production Designers to Shankar in Sivaji (2007), helping with story discussion.

Filmography

References

Tamil film directors
Living people
Indian filmmaking duos
Film directors from Tamil Nadu
20th-century Indian film directors
Screenwriters from Tamil Nadu
Year of birth missing (living people)